Bait is any appetizing substance used to attract prey when hunting or fishing, e.g. food in a mousetrap.

Fishing

The term is especially used with regard to catching fish. Traditionally, nightcrawlers, insects, and smaller fish have been used for this purpose. Fishermen have also begun using plastic bait and, more recently, electronic lures, to attract fish. Because of the risk of transmitting Myxobolus cerebralis (whirling disease), trout and salmon should not be used as bait. There are various types of natural saltwater bait. Studies show that natural baits like croaker and shrimp are better recognized therefore more readily accepted by fish. The best bait for red drum (red fish) are  pogy (menhaden) and, in the fall, specks like croaker.

Hunting
Baiting is a common practice in leopard hunting on a safari. A dead, smaller-sized antelope is usually placed high in the tree to lure the otherwise overcautious leopard. The hunter either watches the bait from point within firing range or stalks the animal if has come for the bait during the night.

In areas where bears are hunted, bait can be found for sale at gas stations and hunting supply stores. Often consisting of some sweet substance, such as frosting or molasses, combined with an aromatic like rotten meat or fish, the bait is spread and the hunter waits under cover for his prey.

Pest control

Poisoned bait is a common method for controlling rats, mice, birds, slugs, snails, ants, cockroaches, and other pests. The basic granules, or other formulation, contains a food attractant for the target species and a suitable poison. For ants, a slow-acting toxin is needed so that the workers have time to carry the substance back to the colony, and for flies, a quick-acting substance to prevent further egg-laying and nuisance. Baits for slugs and snails often contain the molluscide metaldehyde, dangerous to children and household pets.

In Australia
Baiting in Australia refers to specific campaigns to control foxes, wild dogs and dingos by poisoning in areas where they are a problem. These programs are  held in conjunction with the local Department of Primary Industriey, Rural Lands Protection Board (RLPB) and National Parks and Wildlife Service (NPWS) to facilitate a neighbourhood baiting campaign. 

Australian hunters often use carcasses when hunting feral pigs.  Shot feral animals are often left in the field, and the decaying smell attracts more pigs over subsequent days.

See also
Fishing bait
 Fishing lure
 Groundbait/Chumming
Honeypot
Rubby dubby

References

Hunting equipment
Decoys